The 1905 American Medical football team was an American football team that represented the American College of Medicine and Surgery of Chicago, now a part of Loyola University of Chicago in the 1905 college football season. It is likely that American Medical played more contests, but no more against major college teams. In their single known major collegiate contest, American Medical suffered one of the most lopsided defeats in the history of college football, a 142–0 count against Notre Dame. This was the last year American Medical fielded a football team.

Schedule

Roster

 Behrendt, left end
 Irwin, left tackle
 Spar, left guard
 Eide, center
 Denny, right guard
 Bouley, right tackle
 Trombley, right end
 Wittenberg, quarterback
 Newman, left halfback, fullback
 B. Dean, right halfback
 B. Mooney, fullback, left halfback

Game summary

References

American Medical
American Medical football seasons
College football winless seasons
American Medical football